The Critics' Choice Television Award for Best Reality Host is one of the award categories presented annually by the Critics' Choice Television Awards (BTJA) to recognize the work done by television hosts.

Winners and nominees

2010s

Multiple wins
2 wins
Tom Bergeron
Cat Deeley

Multiple nominations
7 nominations
Tom Bergeron

6 nominations
Cat Deeley

5 nominations
RuPaul

3 nominations
Ted Allen
Phil Keoghan
Gordon Ramsay

2 nominations
Anthony Bourdain
Nick Cannon
Carson Daly
James Lipton
Ryan Seacrest

See also
 Primetime Emmy Award for Outstanding Host for a Reality or Reality-Competition Program

References

Critics' Choice Television Awards